Antropikha is a rural locality (a village) in Zadneselskoye Rural Settlement, Ust-Kubinsky District, Vologda Oblast, Russia. The population was 14 as of 2002.

Geography 
Antropikha is located 37 km north of Ustye (the district's administrative centre) by road. Pochinok is the nearest rural locality.

References 

Rural localities in Tarnogsky District